Launceston Rugby Union Football Club is a Rugby Union club in Tasmania. Established in 1998, the club is a member of the Tasmanian Rugby Union and Tasmanian Rugby Union Juniors, affiliated with the Australian Rugby Union and plays in the Tasmanian Statewide League.
 
The club's home ground is at Royal Park in the Launceston, Tasmania. Known as the Tigers and previously the Bumble Bees, the club colours are blue and yellow. The club currently fields a team in Men's Second Division.

The club resulted from a merger of the Glen Dhu Rugby Club and the Riverview Rugby Club in 1998 following an undefeated run by Riverview in 1997 winning the Reserves grade against West Coast with a score 62-10.  The merge of the two Launceston based club resulted in back to back Premierships for Launceston in 1998 and 1999 before losing the State Grand Final to the University of Tasmania in 2000.

Premierships

Reserve Grade

 Riverview - Northern Premiers 1997 (undefeated all Season)

Senior Team
Statewide Premiers First Grade 1998
Statewide Premiers First Grade 1999
Runners up First Grade 2000
Statewide Premiers First Grade 2004
Statewide Premiers First Grade 2006
Runners up First First Grade 2011

Under 18
Premiers 2007

Under 14
Premiers 2006

"Women's Sevens"
Spring Premiers 2016

References

External links
Australian Rugby Union
Tasmanian Rugby Union
Launceston Rugby Union Football Club

Rugby union teams in Tasmania
Rugby clubs established in 1999
1999 establishments in Australia
Sport in Launceston, Tasmania